Peters Creek is a  tributary of the Monongahela River and part of the Ohio River and Mississippi River watersheds, flowing through southwestern Pennsylvania in the United States.

Variant names
According to the Geographic Names Information System, it has also been known historically as: 
 Peter's Creek

Course

Peters Creek starts in Nottingham Township in Washington County and runs generally northerly until it joins the Monongahela River at Clairton in Allegheny County.

Watershed 
The Peters Creek watershed is a diverse fifty square miles in southwestern Allegheny County and northeastern Washington County. From the heavy industry in the east where Peters Creek enters the Monongahela River, to the commercial northeast, the suburban northern communities, and the still rural and farming south, the watershed is a veritable patchwork of land use types. There is also a county park, a turnpike, a landfill, and a coal mining legacy to add to the mix. Some communities are relatively stable while others are undergoing rapid development. Peters Creek and its tributaries provide utility to them all in a myriad of ways.

Tributaries 
Lewis Run, in Jefferson Hills
Beam's Run, in Jefferson Hills
Lick Run, in South Park Township
Piney Fork Run, in South Park Township

Peters Creek also collects numerous unnamed tributaries along its course.

Water quality and recreation 
Because of past water quality issues, Peters Creek was not considered to have any recreational purpose, but since the 1990s the water quality has improved dramatically. Once plagued with garbage and acid mine drainage, the water quality is now high enough to support its own fish population, which includes trout, bass, catfish, carp, and bluegill.  It is now again possible to enjoy the stream through such activities as fishing, swimming, and during high water, kayaking. There is also a new bike trail that runs along its bank, formerly part of the Montour Railroad.

See also
List of rivers of Pennsylvania

References 

Rivers of Pennsylvania
Tributaries of the Monongahela River
Rivers of Allegheny County, Pennsylvania
Rivers of Washington County, Pennsylvania
Allegheny Plateau